Louis Philippe Marie "Alexandre" Berthier, 3rd Prince of Wagram (24 March 1836, Paris – 15 July 1911, Château de Grosbois) was a French nobleman and prince of Wagram. He was the son of Napoléon Alexandre Berthier and Zénaïde Françoise Clary and grandson of Louis Alexandre Berthier, who had been Chief of Staff to Napoleon I.

Marriage and family
On 24 March 1882 he married Bertha Clara von Rothschild (1862–1903), daughter of Mayer Carl von Rothschild. The couple had three children:

 Alexandre Louis Philippe Marie Berthier, 4th Prince of Wagram (1883 – 30 May 1918)
 Elisabeth Berthier de Wagram, (1885–1960), married Prince Henri de La Tour d'Auvergne-Lauraguais (1876–1914)
 Marguerite Berthier de Wagram, (5 Dec 1887 – 25 Jun 1966), married Prince Jacques de Broglie (1878–1974)

Ancestry

References

1836 births
1911 deaths
Princes of Wagram